Jennifer Solow is an American novelist, publisher and entrepreneur, and the author of The Aristobrats and The Booster. In 2021 she became the publisher of Edible Hudson Valley, Edible Westchester, Edible Manhattan and Edible Brooklyn. She is the founder of Doorstep Market.

Born in Pittsburgh, Pennsylvania, she graduated from Winchester Thurston School and Rhode Island School of Design.

Selected works

References

External links
Author website

Living people
Year of birth missing (living people)
21st-century American novelists
American women novelists
Writers from Pittsburgh
Rhode Island School of Design alumni
21st-century American women writers
Novelists from Pennsylvania
Winchester Thurston School alumni